Operation Crucible is a police-led, multi-agency investigation into the organised theft and unlawful trade of metal in England and Wales.

Agencies 
Involved agencies include:
British Transport Police
Metropolitan Police
Hertfordshire Constabulary
Norfolk Constabulary
Suffolk Constabulary
Northamptonshire Police
Leicestershire Police
Essex Police
Cambridgeshire Constabulary
UK Border Agency
Her Majesty's Revenue and Customs
Trading Standards
Historic Buildings and Monuments Commission for England

See also
Operation Icarus - Police investigation into the organised theft and black market trade of religious and church artefacts in England and Wales

References

External links

Architectural conservation
Art and cultural repatriation
Cultural heritage of England
Cultural heritage of Wales
Crucible
Organised crime in England
Organised crime in Wales